Lunistice is a 3D platforming video game developed by A Grumpy Fox and published by Deck13 in 2022.

Gameplay 
Gameplay follows the format of a 3D platformer. The player controls Hana, an anthropomorphic tanuki, and must guide her to the goal at the end of each stage while avoiding enemies and obstacles. Hana can run, jump, double jump, and perform a spinning attack to destroy enemies and extend their jumps. The game tracks number of falls, number of items collected, and time taken to score the player. Level design is based on linear progression, with branching paths containing secret items.

Development 
Lunistice was made by developer A Grumpy Fox, and was initially titled Eversleep. The game was initially intended to be developed in 30 days, though development took over a year. The first iteration of the game was a 2D platformer, with an intermediate version being a 3D rail shooter. Speedrunners were considered during development. Graphics were inspired by games found on the Sega Saturn and the PlayStation.

Following delays in launching, Deck13 published Lunistice on November 10, 2022.

Reception 

Metacritic indicated the Nintendo Switch version received "generally favorable reviews".

Nintendo Life praised the game for its combination of retro inspired aesthetics and level design with contemporary controls, camera, and overall polish. Touch Arcade expressed similar positive sentiment regarding the gameplay, though it noted that some levels could feel too lengthy, and that the overall game was not long.

References 

2022 video games
Deck13 games
Fantasy video games
Indie video games
Nintendo Switch games
Retro-style video games
Single-player video games
Video games about animals
Video games developed in Germany
Video games featuring female protagonists
Windows games
Works about yōkai